Jeremi Przybora (12 December 1915 in Warsaw – 4 March 2004) was a Polish poet, writer, actor and singer.  He created the TV-series "Kabaret Starszych Panów" (Elderly Gentlemen's Cabaret) with Jerzy Wasowski and performed ballads and sung poetry, a popular music genre in Poland.

External links
 About Jeremi Przybora

1915 births
2004 deaths
Musicians from Warsaw
Polish cabaret performers
20th-century Polish poets
20th-century Polish  male singers
20th-century Polish male writers
20th-century comedians